Beartooth National Forest was established in Montana on July 1, 1908 by the U.S. Forest Service with  from part of Yellowstone National Forest and all of Pryor Mountains National Forest.  On February 17, 1932 the forest was divided between Absaroka National Forest and Custer National Forest and the name preserved as the Beartooth Ranger District of Custer National Forest.

See also
 List of forests in Montana

References

External links
Forest History Society
Listing of the National Forests of the United States and Their Dates (from the Forest History Society website) Text from Davis, Richard C., ed. Encyclopedia of American Forest and Conservation History. New York: Macmillan Publishing Company for the Forest History Society, 1983. Vol. II, pp. 743-788.

Former National Forests of Montana
Protected areas of Carbon County, Montana
Protected areas of Park County, Montana
1908 establishments in Montana
Protected areas established in 1908
1932 disestablishments in Montana
Protected areas disestablished in 1932